For the state pageant affiliated with Miss Teen USA, see Miss Connecticut Teen USA

The Miss Connecticut's Teen competition is the pageant that selects the representative for the U.S. state of Connecticut in the Miss America's Teen pageant.

Peyton Troth of Bristol was crowned Miss Connecticut's Outstanding Teen 2022 on April 9, 2022, at the Mohegan Sun in Uncasville, Connecticut. She competed for the title of Miss America's Outstanding Teen 2023 at the Hyatt Regency Dallas in Dallas, Texas on August 12, 2022, where she was a Teens in Action finalist along with winning a Preliminary Evening Wear/On Stage Question award.

In January 2023, the official name of the pageant was changed from Miss Connecticut's Outstanding Teen, to Miss Connecticut's Teen, in accordance with the national pageant.

Results summary 
The results of Miss Connecticut's Outstanding Teen as they participated in the national Miss America's Outstanding Teen competition. The year in parentheses indicates the year of the Miss America's Outstanding Teen competition the award/placement was earned.

Placements 

 1st runners-up: Jainé Coann Truex LeFebvre (2013)

Awards

Preliminary awards 
 Preliminary Evening Wear/On-Stage Question: Jainé Coann Truex LeFebvre (2013), Peyton Troth (2023)

Non-finalist awards 
 Non-finalist Evening Wear/On-Stage Question: Logan West (2011)

Other awards 
 JoAnna Adkisson Community Service Award: Acacia Courtney (2010)
 Teens in Action Finalist: Peyton Troth (2023)
 Top 5 Interview Award: Jainé Coann Truex LeFebvre (2013)
 Top 10 Community Service Award: Jainé Coann Truex LeFebvre (2013)

Winners

References

External links
 Official website

Connecticut
Connecticut culture
Women in Connecticut
Annual events in Connecticut